Greenfield Plantation is a historic plantation house located near Somer, near Edenton, Chowan County, North Carolina.  It was built about 1752, and is a two-story, five bay by two bay, "T"-shaped Georgian-style frame dwelling.  It features a full-width, double porch.  The interior was remodeled in the Greek Revival-style about 1840.

It was listed on the National Register of Historic Places in 1976.

References

Plantation houses in North Carolina
Houses on the National Register of Historic Places in North Carolina
Georgian architecture in North Carolina
Greek Revival houses in North Carolina
Houses completed in 1752
Houses in Chowan County, North Carolina
National Register of Historic Places in Chowan County, North Carolina